Holy Cross is a neighborhood of the city of New Orleans.  A subdistrict of the Lower Ninth Ward District Area, its boundaries as defined by the City Planning Commission are: St. Claude Avenue to the north, St. Bernard Parish to the east, the Mississippi River to the south and the Industrial Canal to the west.

Geography

Adjacent neighborhoods
 Lower Ninth Ward (north)
 St. Bernard Parish (east)
 Mississippi River (south)
 Bywater (west)

Boundaries
The City Planning Commission defines the boundaries of Holy Cross as these streets: St. Claude Avenue, St. Bernard Parish, the Mississippi River and the Industrial Canal.

Demographics
As of the census of 2000, there were 5,507 people, 1,982 households, and 1,315 families residing in the neighborhood.  The population density was 8,099 /mi² (3,059 /km).

As of the census of 2010, there were 2,714 people, 1,040 households, and 642 families residing in the neighborhood.

Holy Cross School
In 1849, the Congregation of the Holy Cross purchased what was once known as Reynes Farm and built St. Isidore’s College, later known as the Holy Cross School, as an all-boys school. The surrounding neighborhood soon took its name from the school. The original campus at 4950 Dauphine Street was destroyed by Hurricane Katrina on August 29, 2005, allowing the school to use FEMA funds to relocate to the Gentilly neighborhood. The historic building now stands abandoned and in danger of demolition by neglect. In August 2012, a portion of the old campus was sold to Perez Architects, which proposed building a 180-unit riverfront apartment complex and immediately applied for a zoning change to increase the height limitations. Opposition from residents arose because the proposed development would negatively impact the historic nature of the neighborhood and create increased density and traffic congestion. Supporters of the plan claimed the project, which also called for storefront and restaurant development, would bring jobs to the area. There has been no progress regarding restoration. The school's administration building has been placed on the Louisiana Trust for Historic Preservation's "Most Endangered Places List." The developer has withdrawn from the project and Perez does not have funds for needed repairs, including a new roof.

See also
 New Orleans neighborhoods

References

Neighborhoods in New Orleans
Louisiana populated places on the Mississippi River